The Covenant Society of the Free Welsh (Welsh: Cymdeithas Cyfamod y Cymry Rhydd) was a society that seceded from Plaid Cymru which was more traditional and anti-socialist.

The organisation aspired for a politically independent Wales by the year 2000.

References

Politics of Wales
Welsh nationalism